Palmerstown (officially Palmerston, see spelling) is a civil parish and suburb in western Dublin on the banks of the River Liffey. It forms part of the South Dublin local authority and the Dublin Mid-West parliamentary constituency. The area is bordered to the north by the River Liffey and the Strawberry Beds, to the west by Lucan, to the south-west by Clondalkin, to the south by Ballyfermot and to the east by the village of Chapelizod. Palmerstown village is situated near the Liffey Valley Shopping Centre. The area is situated near the major junction of the M50 motorway and the N4. It lies approximately 7 km west of O'Connell Street in Dublin city centre. The Old Lucan Road, once the main route from the city to the west, passes through the centre of Palmerstown village.

Name origin and spelling
A "palmer" in medieval times was a pilgrim who returned from the Holy Land with a palm branch or leaf. Between 1185 and 1188 Ailred the Palmer and his wife took religious vows and founded a priory and monastic hospital of Crutched Friars outside the West Gate of Dublin, on the road to Kilmainham, which they endowed with all their property. In 1188 Pope Clement III confirmed the priory's grants, including both the parish of Palmerstown west of Kilmainham and the other parish of Palmerstown northwards in Fingal. Gerard Lee notes an association of palmers with leper hospitals, of which there was one dedicated to Saint Laurence in the townland of the Saint Laurence in Palmerstown.

The spelling "Palmerston" rather than "Palmerstown" was fixed by the Ordnance Survey of Ireland in the 1830s; this remains the legal spelling and is officially recognised by South Dublin County Council. Locals generally use "Palmerstown", and road signs have used both. A plebiscite of residents is required for a legal name change. In 2009 a plebiscite to change to "Palmerstown" received a majority of votes cast but not of eligible voters. The area concerned was the townlands of Palmerston Upper and Palmerston Lower with an estimated electorate of 8,000. Supporters of the change argued that the wording of the ballot confused some voters who wanted "Palmerstown" but voted No. They also argue the spelling without W creates confusion with Palmerston Park further east in Rathmines. Opponents argue the cost of changing road signs is prohibitive. Others argue that the name "Palmerston" legally applies only to the civil parish and townland, and that the locality known as "Palmerstown" has a separate identity. In 2014, another plebiscite was held, restricted to the electoral division (ED) of Palmerston Village (bounded by the Liffey, M50, and N4) and excluding the adjoining ED of Palmerston West. The electorate was 641, of whom 425 voted in favour and 17 against; the change to "Palmerstown Village" was formally approved at the county council meeting in January 2015.

The title Viscount Palmerston created in 1722 in the Peerage of Ireland derives from the place; its spelling also varied, but the form "Lord Palmerston" is now usual for the Victorian prime minister.

Townlands
The civil parish of Palmerstown is the most northerly parish in the former Barony of Uppercross. Much of Palmerstown has been developed for residential, transportation and commercial purposes over the last half century. Townlands include:
 Palmerston Lower 
 Palmerston Upper 
 Irishtown
 Saint Laurence
 Johnstown
 Palmerstown Manor
 Yellow Walls
 Fonthill
 Redcowfarm
 Woodfarm 
 Quarryvale
 Brooklawn
 Liffey Valley

Palmerstown village

The townlands of Palmerstown Upper and Palmerstown Lower straddle the old Lucan Road which was the ancient western highway. Many of Palmerstown's local amenities are located in a cluster along the road. Robin Villas and Hollyville were labourers' cottages built at the beginning of the last century. The old national school is now a community centre. Stewarts Hospital, (formerly the residence of the Hely-Hutchinson family, the Roman Catholic Church of St. Philomena, the National School, the Palmerstown House Pub and Restaurant and a variety of general enterprises, including a bank and convenience stores are located here. Stewartscare is a health care facility at the Stewarts buildings and grounds which overlook the meandering Liffey valley. The Stewarts complex houses the administration of the Irish Health Service Executive. Stewarts Sports and Leisure centre is open to the general public. It also hosts an annual summer camp.

Redcow Farm and Glenaulin Park

This area was the location of the first modern housing development in Palmerstown, constructed between 1955 and 1965. Centred on Manor road, this area contains several shops, the local credit union and a doctor's surgery. To the east of Redcow Farm, adjacent to the "California Hills" Park, is Glenaulin Park, a public park also home to St. Patricks GAA club.  The park contains a short stretch of a local stream, the Glenaulin Stream, a Liffey tributary most of which runs in culvert.

The name 'California Hills' was given by the children of the area to a small wasteland in Ballyfermot to the northeast of Glenaulin Park, which had been a builders' dump during the construction of the main Palmerstown Estate in the mid to late 1960's. The wasteland had a series of small hills which were in fact mounds of rubble which had been buried under clay and eventually over grown with wild grass. The children of the area sometimes shortened the name to 'The Caliers' and this name is also still in use today. The hills or mounds were flattened some years ago and the area landscaped for communal/public use.

Palmerston Lower
Mill Lane leads to the original Palmerstown settlement and centre of industry, which once employed over 600 millhands, craftsmen, and labourers. This seventeenth-century low-lying waterside industrial village was complete with flax, seed, oil, and flour mills. The ruin of a pre-Norman church and the remains of the once prosperous thriving community are situated near the river. A small ferry crossed the Liffey here, to where the Wren's Nest pub was situated on the North side. A football ground opposite the river Liffey is home to Palmerstown F.C. Muhammad Ali visited Stewarts Hospital on 15 July 1972 when the hospital was hosting its annual sporting fete.

Palmerstown Manor
Palmerstown's largest housing estate was built in the early 1990s in the south east of the area. Adjacent to the Coldcut and Kennelsfort roads and the M50 motorway, the estate marks the 'border' between Palmerstown with Ballyfermot and Clondalkin.

Woodfarm Acres
The townland of Woodfarm Acres was mostly farmland, with a few council cottages previously existed on the site. This housing development was built during the 1970s. The estate is bounded by the M50 motorway and N4. Adjacent to Woodfarm Acres is another shopping centre containing a local SuperValu market, a gym and other amenities. Access to the local cemetery is adjacent to this centre. The Silver Granite Pub is located nearby, as is Pobalscoil Isolde, a secondary-level community school which opened in the 1980s.

Oakcourt
The Oakcourt housing estate lies in the western part of the 59-acre Johnstown townland, behind Pobalscoil Iosolde. It was originally developed in the 1970s, and expanded in the mid-1990s. The Johnstown townland extends due west from the Georgian Johnstown House (now St. John's College) on Le Fanu Rd. It runs west to Kennelsfort Road and lies between St. Laurence townland (the St. Laurence House is now the West County Hotel) from the River Liffey and Chapelizod in the north, to Ballyfermot Upper/Blackditch on the south.

Transport
Palmerstown has some of the finest transport links of any Dublin suburb. The main public transport is Dublin Bus running via the N4 at Palmerstown village. Scheduled services run east to the city and west to Lucan, Celbridge, Leixlip and Maynooth. Route 26 operates from Liffey Valley to Dublin city via Kennelsfort Road. Route 18, a circular city route runs from the Old Lucan Road to Sandymount Green via many south Dublin suburbs including Walkinstown, Crumlin and Rathgar. Route G2 operates via the Coldcut road to Spencer Dock via Dublin city. Routes C1, C2, C3 and C4 operate via the Chapelizod Bypass to Ringsend or Sandymount via Dublin City.
Palmerstown railway station on the Dublin and Lucan tramway, later part of the Dublin United Transport Company tram system, opened in November 1881 and closed on 13 April 1940.

Palmerstown Cemetery
Palmerstown Cemetery was originally opened in 1978. It is located on Kennelsfort Road, adjacent to Woodfarm Acres. It is currently being managed as part of the Glasnevin Trust.

See also
 List of towns and villages in the Republic of Ireland

Footnote

References

External links
South Dublin County History
South Dublin County Images
Palmerstown Rangers Football Club Website
St Patricks GAA Hurling, Football and Camogie Club Website

 
Towns and villages in South Dublin (county)
Civil parishes of County Dublin